Coldwater is an unincorporated community in Elbert County, in the U.S. state of Georgia.

History
The community took its name from a local Methodist church, which in turn was named after Coldwater Creek.

References

Unincorporated communities in Elbert County, Georgia
Unincorporated communities in Georgia (U.S. state)